The 2014 California Golden Bears football team represented the University of California, Berkeley in the 2014 NCAA Division I FBS football season. The Bears were led by second-year head coach Sonny Dykes and played their home games at Memorial Stadium. They were members of the North Division of the Pac-12 Conference. When compared to 2013, Cal improved to 5–7, starting out with a 4–1 start, but losing six of their last seven games. It averaged 38.3 points per game, second-best in the Pac-12 and 11th-best in FBS, generating a program-record 459 total points for the season. However, the Golden Bears lost 367.2 passing yards per game along with 42 total passing touchdowns, both of these numbers ranked last out of 128 FBS teams.  From Week 3 to Week 5, the Bears played three consecutive high-scoring games that were won or lost in the final seconds. The Bears lost on a Hail Mary to Arizona 49–45, but beat Colorado 59–56 in double overtime in their next game. The following week, Dykes faced his former Air Raid mentor Mike Leach and the Washington State Cougars. California allowed an FBS record 734 passing yards to Cougars' senior quarterback Connor Halliday, but still won 60–59 when WSU missed a 19-yard field goal with 15 seconds to play. They finished 3–6 in Pac-12, in fourth place in the North Division.

Schedule

Reference:

Personnel

Game summaries
 February 7, 2014 – Defensive end Ted Agu, collapsed and died after a training run

Northwestern

Sacramento State

at Arizona

Colorado

Washington State

Washington

UCLA

1st quarter scoring: UCLA – Paul Perkins 16-yard pass from Brett Hundley (Ka’imi Fairbairn kick)

2nd quarter scoring: Cal – Daniel Lasco 3-yard run (James Langford kick); UCLA – Fairbairn 38-yard field goal; Cal – 
Chris Harper 7-yard pass from Luke Rubenzer (Langford kick); UCLA – Jordan James 11-yard run (Fairbairn kick); UCLA – Perkins 49-yard pass from Hundley (Fairbairn kick)

3rd quarter scoring: Cal – Lasco 2-yard run (James Langford kick); UCLA – Fairbairn 24-yard field goal; Cal – Trevor Davis 24-yard pass from Jared Goff (Langford kick); UCLA – Hundley 15-yard run (Hundley pass fail)

4th quarter scoring: Cal – Kenny Lawler 23-yard pass from Goff (Goff run fail); UCLA – Fairbairn 26-yard field goal

Oregon

Oregon State

USC

Stanford

BYU

References

California
California Golden Bears football seasons
California Golden Bears football